Shelkovskoy (masculine), Shelkovskaya (feminine), or Shelkovskoye (neuter) may refer to:
Shelkovskoy District, a district of the Chechen Republic, Russia
Shelkovskaya, a rural locality (a stanitsa) in the Chechen Republic, Russia